Héctor Hugo Roblero Gordillo (born 28 April 1948) is a Mexican politician affiliated with the Labor Party. As of 2013 he served as Deputy of the LXII Legislature of the Mexican Congress representing Chiapas, and previously served in the LX and LXII Legislatures of the Congress of Chiapas.

References

1948 births
Living people
Politicians from Chiapas
Members of the Congress of Chiapas
Labor Party (Mexico) politicians
20th-century Mexican politicians
21st-century Mexican politicians
Deputies of the LXII Legislature of Mexico
Members of the Chamber of Deputies (Mexico) for Chiapas